Sherry A. Glied (born 1961) is a Canadian-American economist, currently serving as the Dean of New York University's Robert F. Wagner Graduate School of Public Service. From 2010 to 2012, she served as Assistant Secretary at the United States Department of Health and Human Services under the Obama administration.

Early life and education
Glied was born and raised in Toronto, Ontario. She earned a B.A. in economics from Yale University, an M.A. in economics from the University of Toronto, and a Ph.D. in economics from Harvard University.

Career 
From 1992 to 1993, Glied worked as a Senior Economist at the Council of Economic Advisers, where she specialized in healthcare and labor policy. Glied was also a member of the President's Task Force on National Health Care Reform, a committee established by the Clinton health care plan of 1993.

Glied worked as a Professor of Health Policy and Management at Columbia University Mailman School of Public Health, where she was chair of the Department of Health Policy and Management from 1998 to 2009. Glied also served as Assistant Secretary of Health and Human Services for Planning and Evaluation from 2010 to 2012.

Glied has written dozens of academic articles, a number of books, and is a frequent commentator in national media on health care.

Personal life 
Glied married Richard Briffault in 1993. Briffault is an attorney and legal scholar who holds a named professorship at Columbia Law School.

Significant works
 Barbash, Gabriel I., and Sherry A. Glied. "New technology and health care costs—the case of robot-assisted surgery." New England Journal of Medicine 363.8 (2010): 701-704.
 Frank, Richard G., and Sherry A. Glied. Better but not well: Mental health policy in the United States since 1950. JHU Press, 2006.
 Glied, Sherry, and Joshua Graff Zivin. "How do doctors behave when some (but not all) of their patients are in managed care?." Journal of Health Economics 21.2 (2002): 337-353.

References 

Health economists
Writers from Toronto
Canadian expatriate academics in the United States
1961 births
Living people
New York University faculty
Columbia University Mailman School of Public Health faculty
Yale University alumni
University of Toronto alumni
Harvard Graduate School of Arts and Sciences alumni
21st-century Canadian women writers
Canadian women non-fiction writers
Canadian women economists
20th-century  Canadian economists
21st-century Canadian economists
20th-century Canadian women writers
Obama administration personnel
Canadian university and college faculty deans
Members of the National Academy of Medicine